Daniel Grieder (born 6 November 1961) is a Swiss entrepreneur and business executive. Between 2014 and 2020 he was CEO of Tommy Hilfiger Global, as well as CEO of PVH (Phillips Van Heusen Group) Europe and Calvin Klein Europe. Since 2021 he has been CEO of Hugo Boss.

Personal life 
Grieder grew up in Schaffhausen, Switzerland. He completed his vocational education at Globus, and later attended the business school HWV Zurich (Zurich University of Applied Sciences in Business Administration). During this time Grieder founded the trading company Max Trade, which produced, imported and sold leather garments in Switzerland.

Grieder is married to Louise Camuto, and has two sons form his former marriage. He lives in Zurich.

Professional career 
From 1994, under the company name Madison Clothing, he took over the distribution of international brands, such as Pepe Jeans, Stone Island and C.P. Company. In 1997, the company got the tender to become the sales agency for Tommy Hilfiger in Grieder's native Switzerland, Austria and Eastern Europe, responsible to establish the brand there. Later in 2004, he joined Tommy Hilfiger as Vice President of Commercial Operations on the Board of Tommy Hilfiger Europe. In 2005, Grieder was involved in Hilfiger's change of ownership. As a result, the company moved its headquarters from New York to Amsterdam. In 2008, Grieder became CEO of Tommy Hilfiger Europe. Later in 2014, he was appointed as CEO of Tommy Hilfiger Global and at the same time CEO for Calvin Klein Europe and PVH Europe. Grieder stepped down of those positions in June 2020. During his tenure the company digitised its offers and on his initiative was one of the first to introduce "see now, buy now" at fashion shows, where both retailers and customers who followed the catwalk could order clothes while the show was still on.

In mid-June 2020, the German fashion company Hugo Boss announced that Grieder would become their CEO. Grieder took up his new position in June 2021, after serving a post-contractual competition prohibition.

Since April 2022 Grieder has been member of the board of directors at Rieter.

Publications 
 Gen Z für Entscheider:innen, co-authored. Yael Meier et al. (ed.), Frankfurt am Main: Campus Verlag. 2022. ISBN 978-3593452418.

References 

1961 births
Businesspeople in fashion
People from Schaffhausen
Swiss business executives
Living people